Manolito Gafotas is a 1994 children's novel written by the Spanish writer Elvira Lindo and illustrated by Emilio Urberuaga. It is the first of a series of novels about the adventures of a working class kid in Carabanchel that inspired two movies in 1999 and 2004 and a TV series.

The novel has been translated into English as Manolito Four-Eyes. The Kirkus review comments on its chatty, first person narrative and understated humor and describes it as "a classic in its native Spain."

In January 2020, the author and the publisher announced that Hollywood film and TV studio EXILE Content headed by former Univision and Televisa chief content officer Isaac Lee will create a TV Series based on the book.

Books
 Manolito Gafotas (1994)
 Pobre Manolito (1995)
 ¡Cómo molo!: (otra de Manolito Gafotas) (1996)
 Los trapos sucios de Manolito Gafotas (1997)
 Manolito on the road (1998)
 Yo y el Imbécil (1999)
 Manolito tiene un secreto (2002)
 Mejor Manolo (2012)

External links
 Página Oficial

References

1994 novels
1994 children's books
Spanish children's novels
Series of children's books
Novels set in Madrid
Spanish novels adapted into films